Passerelle may refer to:
 Passerelle (Luxembourg), a bridge in the city of Luxembourg
 La Passerelle, a newspaper in Besançon, France
 Passerelle (theatre), a semicircular ramp or catwalk that extends from the stage of a theater around the orchestra pit

See also 
 Passerelle clause, provision included in various treaties within the European Union
 Paris bridges with "Passerelle" in their names